Pyarelal Khandelwal (6 April 1925 – 6 October 2009) was a Rashtriya Swayamsevak Sangh pracharak and Bharatiya Janata Party politician in India and served as a member of the Parliament of India representing Madhya Pradesh in the Rajya Sabha, the upper house of the Indian Parliament.

Khandelwal beat Digvijay Singh in the Indian general election of 1989, being returned as the member for the Rajgarh Lok Sabha constituency.

Khandelwal died following a cardiac arrest on 6 October 2009.  He was 84 years old and had been suffering from cancer.

References

External links
 Pyarelal Khandelwal
 Profile on Rajya Sabha website
 Pyarelal Khandelwal cremated

1925 births
2009 deaths
Rashtriya Swayamsevak Sangh pracharaks
Bharatiya Janata Party politicians from Madhya Pradesh
Rajya Sabha members from Madhya Pradesh
People from Madhya Pradesh
India MPs 1989–1991
People from Rajgarh district
Lok Sabha members from Madhya Pradesh